Dejan Rusmir (born January 28, 1980) is a Serbian retired footballer.

Career

Serbia
Rusmir began his career in the youth ranks of Radnički Jugopetrol. After impressing with Radnički, Rusmir moved to top Serbian club Partizan. While with Partizan, Rusmir was part of the squads that captured the 2001–02 and 2002–03 First League titles. In 2003, he left Partizan and moved to Rad where he remained for three years.

Romania
In 2006, Rusmir signed with newly promoted Romanian Liga I side Ceahlăul Piatra Neamț and quickly established himself as the club's attacking midfielder. In his two seasons with the club, Rusmir appeared in 53 Liga I matches and scored 10 goals. For the 2008–09 Liga I season Rusmir joined Farul Constanța and appeared in 27 league matches scoring 5 goals, however he was unable to help Farul avoid relegation to Liga II. For the 2009–10 season, Rusmir remained with Farul and played in Liga II appearing in 10 league matches and scoring 1 goal.

United States
In February 2011, Rusmir went on trial with Major League Soccer's Columbus Crew. He was included on the Crew's roster heading into the team's 2011 CONCACAF Champions League quarterfinal series against Real Salt Lake., and formally signed with the team on March 9, 2011. He played his first league game with the Crew on March 19, 2011 in the 2011 MLS season opener against D.C. United. Rusmir was released by Columbus on November 23, 2011.

Cyprus
In January 2012, Rusmir signed for Cypriot First Division club Olympiakos Nicosia for 6 months.

References

External links
Columbus Crew Profile

fcfarul.ro
Profile znange.org

1980 births
Living people
Footballers from Belgrade
Serbian footballers
Association football midfielders
FK Radnički Beograd players
FK Partizan players
FK Rad players
CSM Ceahlăul Piatra Neamț players
FCV Farul Constanța players
Columbus Crew players
Olympiakos Nicosia players
FK Hajduk Kula players
FK Novi Pazar players
Liga I players
Major League Soccer players
Serbian SuperLiga players
Cypriot First Division players
Serbian expatriate footballers
Expatriate footballers in Romania
Expatriate soccer players in the United States
Expatriate footballers in Cyprus
FK Partizan non-playing staff